was a village located in Kiso District, Nagano Prefecture, Japan.

As of 2003, the village had an estimated population of 2,692 and a density of 47.54 persons per km². The total area was 56.63 km².

On November 1, 2005, Hiyoshi, along with the town of Kisofukushima, and the villages of Kaida and Mitake (all from Kiso District), was merged to create the town of Kiso.

Dissolved municipalities of Nagano Prefecture
Kiso, Nagano (town)